Historic District D is a national historic district located at Boonville, Cooper County, Missouri.  It encompasses 87 contributing buildings in the central business district of Boonville.  The district includes representative examples of Late Victorian and Classical Revival style architecture.  Located in the district is the separately listed Lyric Theater.  Other notable buildings include the Geiger's Furniture and Appliance (1870s), Missouri Power and Light Co (1900-1910), Palace Restaurant and Cocktail Lounge (mid-1800s), Boonville Music Co. (1870s), Nelson Memorial Methodist Church (1915-1917), United Missouri Bank (1914), Knights of Pythias Building (1920), First Presbyterian Church (1833, 1904), P.N. Hirsch & Co. Department Store (1860s-1870s), Cooper County Recorder (mid-1800s), Cooper County Abstract and Insurance Co. (1910), and Cooper County Courthouse (1911-1912).

It was listed on the National Register of Historic Places in 1983.

References

Historic districts on the National Register of Historic Places in Missouri
Victorian architecture in Missouri
Neoclassical architecture in Missouri
National Register of Historic Places in Cooper County, Missouri
Central business districts in the United States
Boonville, Missouri